Rugby player can refer to:

 A player of rugby union 
 A player of rugby sevens
 A player of rugby league 
 A player of rugby league sevens
 A player of rugby league nines
 A player of both codes of rugby football
 A player of wheelchair rugby

See also
:Category:Rugby union players
:Category:rugby league players
:Category:Wheelchair rugby players